The Dufour 24 is a French trailerable sailboat that was designed by Michel Dufour and first built in 1975.

Production
The design was built by Dufour Yachts in France from 1975 to 1979, with 720 boats completed, but it is now out of production.

Design
The Dufour 24 is a recreational keelboat, built predominantly of fiberglass, with wood trim. It has a fractional sloop rig, a raked stem, a nearly plumb transom, a transom-hung rudder controlled by a tiller and a fixed fin keel or optional shoal draft keel. It displaces  and carries  of ballast.

The boat is fitted with a Swedish Volvo MD6A diesel engine or, optionally, a small  outboard motor for docking and maneuvering.

The design has sleeping accommodation for four people, with a double "V"-berth in the bow cabin and two straight settee quarter berths in the main cabin. The galley is located on both sides of the companionway ladder and is equipped with a stove and a sink. There are no provisions for a head. The boat has no companionway hatch and instead has a raised domed entrance.

Operational history
In a 2010 review Steve Henkel wrote, "this is a design with some unusual characteristics. You might expect a sleek, rounded hull from the French, a la Beneteau, but here you get high topsides, not an inch of springy sheer, and only a small spread of sail, oddly shifted forward, (It may be that the mast has been ooched forward to be positioned directly over the main bulkhead for support.) The hull design is apparently aimed at maximizing cabin space: a squared-off, slab-sided hull with the beam stretched wide all the way back to the transom; high topsides, and a bubble in the small coachroof to squeeze in extra inches of headroom and to aid in access to the cabin, since there is no companionway hatch. There are two keel options: shoal, with a draft of 2' 5" (too shallow for good upwind performance), and 'deep fin' with a draft of 3' 10" Best features: Very deep cockpit coamings provide excellent back support. Worst features: The high, slab-sided topsides and small sail area make for unusually large 'top hamper,' which will tend to catch the wind and slide the boat sideways, especially in light air when the going is slow and the keel isn't moving fast enough to take a bite. The absence of a companionway hatch will make access to the cabin difficult for some. And where, you might ask, is the head? We don't see one, or a place for one. You could use a bucket in the 1970s, but not anymore."

See also
List of sailing boat types

References

External links
Video of a Dufour 24 sailing

Keelboats
1970s sailboat type designs
Sailing yachts
Trailer sailers
Sailboat type designs by Michel Dufour
Sailboat types built by Dufour Yachts